Dong Yi may refer to:

Dong Yi (TV series), a Korean drama
Dong Yi (Qin Dynasty), a Qin Dynasty general
Consort Suk of the Choe clan, King Sukjong's concubine
Dongyi may refer to an ethnic group known from Chinese history